Kimberley Simms (born July 27, 1963, in Toledo, Ohio) is an American actress, best known for her role as Mindy Lewis on Guiding Light. Replacing actress Krista Tesreau in the role, Simms played the role from July 1989 until her departure in September 1992.

Simms also appeared in an episode of Burke's Law, titled "Who Killed the Soap Star?"

She is married to chef Christopher Blobaum since 2001. The couple have a daughter, Tuesday, whom they adopted from China.

References

External links

1963 births
Living people
American soap opera actresses
21st-century American women